is a Japanese astronomer from Awa in the Tokushima Prefecture. The Minor Planet Center credits him with the co-discovery of 6 asteroids made together with Japanese astronomer Toshimasa Furuta at the Tokushima-Kainan Astronomical Observatory  in 1988 and 1989.

The inner main-belt asteroid 4951 Iwamoto, discovered by astronomers Yoshikane Mizuno and Toshimasa Furuta, was named in his honor on 5 March 1996.

References 
 

Discoverers of asteroids

20th-century Japanese astronomers
Living people
Year of birth missing (living people)